The following lists events that happened during 2015 in Rwanda.

Incumbents 
 President: Paul Kagame 
 Prime Minister: Anastase Murekezi

Events

January
 January 23 - Two Rwandan policemen charged in the murder of an anti-corruption activist are sentenced to 20 years in prison.

Deaths
 January 8 - Jean-Claude Gasigwa, 31, Tennis player (Davis Cup team)

References

 
2010s in Rwanda
Years of the 21st century in Rwanda
Rwanda
Rwanda